Pachnessa is a genus of beetles belonging to the family Melolonthidae.

Species:

Pachnessa drumonti 
Pachnessa krali 
Pachnessa merkli 
Pachnessa nicobarica 
Pachnessa smetsi 
Pachnessa vietnamica

References

Scarabaeidae
Beetle genera